David Galloway (fourth ¼ 1884 – 22 February 1913) was a Welsh professional rugby league footballer who played in the 1900s and 1910s. He played at representative level for Wales, and at club level for Treherbert RLFC and Hull FC, as a forward (prior to the specialist positions of), during the era of contested scrums. Treherbert RLFC completed only 12-matches during the 1909–10 season, and as defaulters, they were prevented from playing in the 1910–11 season, by which time both Alfred Francis, and David Galloway had joined Hull FC.

Background
David Galloway's birth was registered in Pontypridd district, Wales, he was the son of John Galloway, and Emma Denby, he was the youngest of 5 children, he was the Great-Uncle of Anita Gale, Baroness Gale, he died at 28 Dunraven Street, Treherbert, Rhondda, his death was registered in Pontypridd district, and he was buried on 26 February 1913 in Treorchy Cemetery, Rhondda, Wales (Plot A2 8).

International honours
David Galloway won 2 caps for Wales in 1909–1910 while at Treherbert RLFC.

References

External links
(archived by web.archive.org) Stats – PastPlayers – "G" at hullfc.com
(archived by web.archive.org) Statistics at hullfc.com

1884 births
1913 deaths
Hull F.C. players
Rugby league forwards
Rugby league players from Pontypridd
Treherbert RLFC players
Wales national rugby league team players
Welsh rugby league players